Salah ol Din Qala (also Romanized as Salāh ol Dīn Qalā, Salāheddin Qalā, Şalāḩ od Dīn Qalā, and Salahoddin Qala; also known as, Şalaḩ ed Dīn Qalā-ye ‘Olyā, Şalāḩ od Dīn Qalā-ye ‘Olyā, and Şalaḩ od Dīn Qalā-ye ‘Olyā) is a village in Baladeh Kojur Rural District, in the Central District of Nowshahr County, Mazandaran Province, Iran. At the 2006 census, its population was 2,370, in 612 families.

References 

Populated places in Nowshahr County